Penicillium thomii is an anamorph species of fungus in the genus Penicillium which was isolated from spoiled faba beans in Australia. Penicillium thomii produces hadicidine, 6-methoxymelline and penicillic acid

Further reading

References 

thomii
Fungi described in 1917